Vânia Neves (born 4 September 1990) is a Portuguese swimmer. She competed in the women's marathon 10 kilometre event at the 2016 Summer Olympics.

References

External links
 

1990 births
Living people
Portuguese female swimmers
Female long-distance swimmers
Olympic swimmers of Portugal
Swimmers at the 2016 Summer Olympics
Place of birth missing (living people)